Brittany Johnston (born January 6, 1986) is an American female professional golfer currently playing on the Futures Tour.

Personal
Johnston was born in Cleveland, Ohio, on January 6, 1986, to Rod and Sandy Johnston.  Her father is a PGA Master Golf Professional.  She resides in Akron, Ohio.

College
Johnston played college golf all four years at Northwestern University.  She chose to go to Northwestern over Princeton, Bradley, and Penn State.  She graduated with her bachelor's degree in Political Science.

Professional
Johnston turned professional in 2008, and joined the Futures Tour on January 15, 2008.  She qualified for the 2011 U.S. Women's Open, but failed to make the cut with scores of 81 and 80.

Professional wins (1)

Futures Tour wins (1)

References

External links

Profile at Northwestern University's sports site

American female golfers
Northwestern Wildcats women's golfers
Golfers from Cleveland
Sportspeople from Akron, Ohio
1986 births
Living people
21st-century American women